Dmitry Chizhik is an electrical engineer at Bell Labs in Holmdel, New Jersey. Chizhik was named a Fellow of the Institute of Electrical and Electronics Engineers (IEEE) in 2014 for contributions to wireless channel modeling.

Born in Kyiv, Ukraine, Chizhik immigrated to America  in the late seventies with both his parents.  He now lives in New Jersey with his wife and four daughters.

Education
 Ph.D. in electrophysics. Minor: physics, NYU Polytechnic Institute
 M.S. in electrical engineering, NYU Polytechnic Institute
 B.S. in electrical engineering, NYU Polytechnic Institute

References 

Fellow Members of the IEEE
Living people
Polytechnic Institute of New York University alumni
Year of birth missing (living people)
American electrical engineers